Peth may refer to:

Peths in Pune, places (peths) in Pune, India
Kasba Peth
Budhwar Peth
 Peth Islampur, a village in Sangli district, Maharashtra, India
 Peth taluka, a taluka in Nashik district, Maharashtra State, India
 Peth, Dahanu, a village in Maharashtra, India
 Astrid Peth, a character played by Kylie Minogue on Dr. Who
 Phosphatidylethanol
 Peristimulus time histogram, sometimes called pre-event time histogram or PETH
 The Peth, a band formed in 2008 by drummer Dafydd Ieuan